Cannabis in Minnesota is  legal for medical use as of 2014. As of July 1, 2022, food and beverages containing THC are legal in Minnesota if the THC is derived from hemp and is limited to  5mg THC per serving. Non-medical recreational smoking of cannabis remains illegal in Minnesota.

History

Decriminalization

Medical marijuana
The Minnesota Medical Marijuana Act creates a patient registry under the Department of Health relating to the therapeutic use of medical cannabis. It authorizes the use of medical cannabis in limited forms for certain qualifying medical conditions and regulates the distribution and manufacture of medical cannabis. It also creates a task force to conduct an impact assessment on medical cannabis therapeutic research and provides for certain criminal and civil protections for parties involved in the registry program. This passed the House 89–40 and the Senate 46–16.

In May 2014, Governor Mark Dayton signed into law a bill legalizing marijuana for the treatment of nine severe medical conditions, including cancer, severe epilepsy, HIV/AIDS, glaucoma, Tourette's syndrome, ALS and Crohn's Disease.

Registration for the program began on June 1, 2015, with actual distribution of medical marijuana beginning July 1, 2015. It is considered to be the most restrictive medical marijuana bill in the country, due to the limited number of medical conditions that qualify, and the forms of cannabis that are legal. To qualify for the program, patients must be diagnosed with one of the following conditions: Cancer (with pain, nausea, vomiting, and/or wasting), Glaucoma, HIV/AIDS, Tourettes, ALS (Lou Gehrig's Disease), a seizure disorder, Multiple Sclerosis, Crohn's Disease, or a painful terminal illness with less than a year to live. For those individuals who meet the medical criteria, cannabis will only be legally available in liquid, pill or vaporized delivery method that does not require the use of dried leaves or plant form. In 2016, "intractable pain" was added to the list of qualifying conditions, with PTSD added August 1, 2017. Chronic pain and age-related macular degeneration were also added to the list of qualifying conditions on December 1, 2019; the changes went into effect in August 2020.

Recreational use cannabis 
On November 6, 2018, Tim Walz was elected  Governor of Minnesota. Walz argued that legalizing cannabis could bring in a new source of tax revenue if regulated properly, and it could reduce the number of people locked up for drug offenses: "I just think the time is here and we're seeing it across the country. Minnesota has always been able to implement these things right."

On January 28, 2019, Senators Melisa Franzen and Scott Jensen and Representative Mike Freiberg introduced a bill that would allow people over 21 to possess, grow, and purchase limited quantities of cannabis. In a statement from Mike Feiberg "Our focus in drafting legislation to end the prohibition of cannabis in Minnesota is to ensure we have a responsible regulatory model for consumer access that still provides for public health, safety and welfare," he continued. "The time has come for us to have this debate."

On March 8, 2019, Republicans in the Minnesota Senate voted down a measure to legalize the recreational use of cannabis. Republicans also decided not to create a task-force to study the issue further. Sen. Melisa Franzen (D-Edina), who sponsored the measure said "We don't have a bill to move, so I think the debate is shut down in the Senate," noting that Governor Tim Walz could convene a task force of his own but chose to not do so. Several proposals remain under consideration in the House, including the creation of a task force, similar to what Franzen proposed, and a constitutional amendment to let voters decide the fate of legalizing, taxing and regulating the recreational use of cannabis.

As of July 1, 2022, food and beverages containing THC are legal in Minnesota if the THC is derived from hemp. Packages must be limited to a THC content of 50mg total and 5mg per serving. The legislation was enacted in part to address previously unregulated delta-8 THC products. It is unclear if leaders of the Minnesota Senate understood that this legislation would legalize products with delta-9 THC.

Democrats took control of the Minnesota Senate in the 2022 election and made it clear that cannabis would be on their list of top legislative priorities. In January 2023, DFL Representative Zack Stephenson and Senator Lindsey Port introduced a bill to legalize recreational marijuana.

See also
 Minnesota NORML

References